Pepperrell may refer to:

Everett Pepperrell Wheeler (1840–1925), American lawyer, author, and politician
Lady Pepperrell House, historic house on State Route 103 in Kittery Point, Maine, United States
Pepperrell Air Force Base, U.S. military base in St. John's, Newfoundland, Canada from 1941 to 1960
William Pepperrell (1696–1759), merchant and soldier in Colonial Massachusetts
William Pepperrell House, historic house on State Route 103 (ME 103) in Kittery Point, Maine

See also
Pepperell (disambiguation)
Paparella